Ornithoica are genus of biting flies in the family of louse flies, Hippoboscidae. There are 23 known species. All species are parasites of birds.

Distribution
Ornithoica are found worldwide with the exception of Antarctica, however the largest number of species are found in South East Asia.

Systematics
Genus Ornithoica Rondani, 1878
Subgenus Ornithoica Rondani, 1878
Ornithoica unicolor Speiser, 1900
Ornithoica confluenta (Say, 1823)
Ornithoica podicipis Von Roder, 1892
Ornithoica beccariina Rondani, 1878
Ornithoica caleconica Sinclair, 1997
Ornithoica turdi (Latreille, 1812)
Ornithoica vicina (Walker, 1849)
Ornithoica zamicra Maa, 1966
Ornithoica rabori Maa, 1966
Ornithoica bistativa Maa, 1966
Ornithoica philippinensis Ferris, 1927
Ornithoica stipituri (Schiner, 1868)
Ornithoica tridens Maa, 1966
Ornithoica momiyamai Kishida, 1932
Ornithoica simplicis Maa, 1966
Ornithoica hovana Maa, 1966
Ornithoica exilis (Walker, 1861)
Ornithoica podargi Maa, 1966
Ornithoica aequisenta Maa, 1966
Ornithoica punctatissima Maa, 1966
Ornithoica pusilla (Schiner, 1868)
Subgenus Lobolepis Maa, 1966
Ornithoica submicans Maa, 1963
Ornithoica curvata Maa, 1963
Ornithoica hirtisternum Maa, 1963

References

Parasites of birds
Hippoboscidae
Hippoboscoidea genera
Taxa named by Camillo Rondani